Thomas Miller Bell (January 11, 1923 – November 12, 1996) was a Canadian politician, lawyer and barrister. He was elected to the House of Commons of Canada as a Member of the Progressive Conservative Party to represent the riding of St. John—Albert in 1953. He became Parliamentary Assistant to the Minister of Trade and Commerce in 1957. This position was succeeded by Parliamentary Secretary to the Minister of Justice and Attorney General of Canada for which he served three terms. He became the Chief Opposition Whip in 1968 until 1973 followed by Opposition House Leader of the Progressive Conservatives. He was also a member of the Standing Joint Committee on the Parliamentary Restaurant for two terms. He was defeated in 1974, after serving two terms for Saint John—Lancaster.

Bell was born in Saint John, New Brunswick, Canada. Prior to his federal political experience, he served in the Merchant Navy during World War II. His grandfather, Thomas Bell, also was a Member of Parliament.

Electoral history

References
 

1923 births
1996 deaths
Members of the House of Commons of Canada from New Brunswick
Politicians from Saint John, New Brunswick
Progressive Conservative Party of Canada MPs